Juraj Sviatko (born 22 October 1980) is a Slovak former competitive figure skater. He is a six-time national champion and placed 8th at the 1998 World Junior Championships. As a senior, his highest placement was 17th at the 2002 European Championships.

Programs

Competitive highlights
JGP: Junior Series/Junior Grand Prix

References

External links
 

Slovak male single skaters
1980 births
Living people
Sportspeople from Košice
Competitors at the 2001 Winter Universiade